Michael Sydney Cedric Brudenell-Bruce, 8th Marquess of Ailesbury (born 31 March 1926), styled Viscount Savernake until 1961 and Earl of Cardigan between 1961 and 1974, is a Scottish peer.

Biography
The Marquess was born the son of Cedric Brudenell-Bruce, 7th Marquess of Ailesbury by his wife, Joan Houlton Salter, the daughter of the architect Stephen Salter. He attended Eton College before serving in the Royal Horse Guards. He received an emergency commission as a second lieutenant on 12 August 1945, only three weeks prior to the end of the Second World War. He was promoted to lieutenant on 1 September 1946, and entered the reserves with the same rank on 1 September 1949, with the honorary rank of captain. He relinquished his reserve commission on 1 July 1959, retaining the honorary rank of captain.

He became a member of the London Stock Exchange in 1954. He joined the stockbrokers Bragg, Stockdale, Hall & Co, founded in 1819, in the City of London, which merged with Fiske & Co in 1975 and he became a partner of Fiske. He became a director of Fiske & Co when it became a limited company, and remained so when it went public as Fiske plc.

He succeeded his father as 8th Marquess on the latter's death on 15 July 1974.

The family seat is Tottenham House, in Savernake Forest, Wiltshire, but they ceased to live there in 1946 when it became Hawtreys school. The Marquess owned Avebury Manor, also in Wiltshire, from 1976 to 1981.

Marriages and issue
The Marquess has married three times. His first wife, Edwina Sylvia de Winton-Wills (1933-2023), was the daughter of Lt. Col. Sir Ernest Edward de Winton-Wills, 4th Baronet Wills of Hazelwood, of the W.D. & H.O. Wills tobacco company, by his wife Sylvia Margaret Ogden. They were married on 17 March 1952 and were divorced in 1961. They had three children:
 David Brudenell-Bruce, Earl of Cardigan (born 1952), heir apparent to the marquessate, and the other titles.
 Lady Sylvia Davina Brudenell-Bruce (born 1954) who married Peter M. Gould in 1987.
 Lady Carina Doune Brudenell-Bruce (born 1956) who married Anthony Le Brun on 26 June 1982.

Edwina married secondly Major Christopher Bonn with whom she had four further children. 

On 10 July 1963, the Marquess married a second time, to Juliet Adrienne Lethbridge Kingsford, daughter of Edward Hilary Lethbridge Kingsford. The couple divorced in 1974 after having two children:
 Lady Louise Brudenell-Bruce (born 1964), and
 Lady Kathryn Juliet Brudenell-Bruce (born 1965).

On 18 September 1974, shortly after his second divorce, he married for the third time. The bride, Caroline Elizabeth Wethered, was the daughter of Commander Owen Francis MacTier Wethered. They had no children, and although this was the longest-lasting of his marriages, the couple were divorced in 1992.

References

thePeerage.com
'AILESBURY', Who Was Who, A & C Black, 1920–2007; online edn, Oxford University Press, Dec 2007

External links

1926 births
Living people
British Army personnel of World War II
Michael
Earls of Cardigan
8
People educated at Eton College
Royal Horse Guards officers

Ailesbury